The Bohemian Girl is a 1936 comedic feature film version of the opera The Bohemian Girl by Michael William Balfe. Directed by James W. Horne and Charles Rogers, and it was produced at the Hal Roach Studios, and stars Laurel and Hardy, and Thelma Todd in her final film role. This was also the only appearance of Darla Hood in a full-length feature produced by Hal Roach.

Plot

A group of gypsy caravans set up on the edge of a wood. They realise they are camped on the estate of Count Arnheim who will not tolerate their presence. The gypsies sing and dance to entertain themselves.

Stanley Laurel and Oliver Hardy are the misfit pair of Gypsies in the group. When hen-pecked Oliver is out pickpocketing, fortune-telling or attending his zither lessons, his wife (Mae Busch) has an affair with Devilshoof (Antonio Moreno). A cruel nobleman, Count Arnheim (William P. Carleton), persecutes the Gypsies, who are forced to flee, but Mrs Hardy, in revenge for Devilshoof being lashed by the count's orders, kidnaps his daughter, Arline (Darla Hood), and Mrs. Hardy fools Hardy into thinking she is their daughter since he believes everything she tells him. She soon elopes with Devilshoof, and leaves Oliver and "Uncle" Stanley holding the toddler. Arline is too young to remember her old life.

Twelve years later, the Gypsies return to Arnheim's estate. When grown-up Arline (Jacqueline Wells) accidentally trespasses in Arnheim's garden, she recognises the place and Arnheim's voice, but is arrested by a constable (Jimmy Finlayson) and sentenced to a lashing. Stan and Oliver try to save her, but Stan is too drunk and both are arrested. Just as Arline is stripped in order to be lashed, she is rescued in time by Arnheim, who recognises a medallion she wears and a family birthmark, and both try to rescue Stan and Oliver. It is too late though: Laurel and Hardy had already been worked over in the torture chamber: Hardy emerges stretched to a height of eight feet, while Stan has been crushed to only a few feet tall and the constable just stands yelling and moaning.

Cast 
 Stan Laurel as Stan
 Oliver Hardy as Ollie
 Jacqueline Wells as Arline
 Darla Hood as Arline as a child
 Mae Busch as Mrs. Hardy
 Antonio Moreno as Devilshoof, Mrs. Hardy's lover
 William P. Carleton as Count of Arnheim 
 James Finlayson as Finn, Captain of the Guard
 Zeffie Tilbury as old Gypsy Queen 
 Mitchell Lewis as Salinas, Gypsy Queen's advisor
 Harry Bowen as Laurel and Hardy's first victim (the drunkard)
 Sam Lufkin as Laurel and Hardy's second victim (the innkeeper)
 Eddie Borden as Laurel and Hardy's third victim (the nobleman)
 James C. Morton as the officer who arrests the nobleman
 Harry Bernard as bell ringer
 Thelma Todd as singer of "Heart of a Gypsy"
 Felix Knight as singer of "Then You'll Remember Me"
 Winter Hall as Servant (uncredited) 
 Howard C. Hickman as Dignified Captain (uncredited)

Casting and production details
Metro-Goldwyn-Mayer wanted to cast a talented newcomer as Arline. Hal Roach cast Darla Hood, who had just begun appearing in Roach's Our Gang comedies, as young Arline and Julie Bishop as adult Arline.

Rosina Lawrence dubs Jacqueline Wells's singing.

Paulette Goddard has a small uncredited role as a Gypsy.

Stan Laurel's pet myna, Yogi, appears in the film.

The Count was played by W.P. Carleton, who had played the role on stage over a number of decades.

Ban in Malaysia and Germany 
The film was banned in Malaysia due to its depictions of Roma themes. It was also banned in Nazi Germany due to its positive depiction of gypsies, which Joseph Goebbels, the minister of propaganda for the regime, said "had no place" in the Third Reich.

References

External links 

 
 
 
 
 

1936 films
1936 musical comedy films
American musical comedy films
American black-and-white films
Films about child abduction
Films based on operas
Films based on works by Miguel de Cervantes
Films directed by Charley Rogers
Films directed by James W. Horne
Films set in the 18th century
Bohemia in fiction
Laurel and Hardy (film series)
Metro-Goldwyn-Mayer films
Operetta films
Films based on Spanish novels
Films about Romani people
Works based on La gitanilla
1930s American films